The 2010–11 season is Ipswich Town's ninth consecutive season in The Football League Championship, the second-highest division in the English football league system.  In addition to competing in The Championship, Ipswich Town are also competing in the League Cup and the FA Cup. Manager Roy Keane was sacked after the defeat to Nottingham Forest in January after a season-and-a-half in charge. First-team coach Ian McParland presided over the FA Cup defeat at Chelsea and the League Cup semi-final 1st leg win over Arsenal before Paul Jewell took over the managerial role on a permanent basis.

First-team squad

Left club during season

Under-23 squad

First-team coaching staff
Until 7 January:

From 13 January:

Pre-season

Competitions

Football League Championship

League table

Results summary

Results by round

Matches

August

September

October

November

December

January

February

March

April

May

FA Cup

Football League Cup

Ipswich Town reached the semi-final of the League Cup for the first time in 10 years.

Transfers

Transfers in

 Total spending:  £1.65 million+

Loans in

Transfers out

 Total income:  £3.4 million+

Loans out

Squad statistics
All statistics updated as of end of season

Appearances and goals

|-
! colspan=14 style=background:#dcdcdc; text-align:center| Goalkeepers

|-
! colspan=14 style=background:#dcdcdc; text-align:center| Defenders

|-
! colspan=14 style=background:#dcdcdc; text-align:center| Midfielders

|-
! colspan=14 style=background:#dcdcdc; text-align:center| Forwards

|-
! colspan=14 style=background:#dcdcdc; text-align:center| Players transferred out during the season

|-
! colspan=14 style=background:#dcdcdc; text-align:center| Loan players returning to parent clubs during the season

|-

Goalscorers

Clean sheets

Disciplinary record

Starting 11
Considering starts in all competitions

Awards

Player awards

Football League Championship Player of the Month

Football League Young Player of the Year

Championship Apprentice Award

References

External links
Marston, Carl.  Town stats and media reflections, The Green 'Un

Ipswich Town F.C. seasons
Ipswich Town